Platičevo is a village in Serbia. It is located in the Ruma municipality, in the Srem District, Vojvodina province. The village has a Serb ethnic majority and its population numbering 2,760 people (2002 census).

Historical population

1961: 2,726
1971: 2,824
1981: 2,812
1991: 2,809

See also
List of places in Serbia
List of cities, towns and villages in Vojvodina

References
Slobodan Ćurčić, Broj stanovnika Vojvodine, Novi Sad, 1996.

External links 

Platičevo

Populated places in Syrmia